William Albro De Groot (November 27, 1869 – March 1, 1932) was an American lawyer and politician from New York.

Life 
De Groot was born on November 27, 1869 in Brooklyn, New York, the son of Alexander De Groot and Jane McCullough.

De Groot moved to Orange County with his parents when he was seven. He grew up on a farm until 1881, when he returned to Brooklyn. When he was 14, he went to work in a business trade. When he was 18, he went to Mount Hermon School near Northfield, Massachusetts. He then went to Wesleyan Academy. In 1892, he was admitted to the Dickinson College in Carlisle, Pennsylvania. He graduated from there in 1897. He then went to New York University Law School and was admitted to the bar in 1899. He then practiced law in Brooklyn, initially as a member of the firm DeGroot, Kenyon & Hubbard, and then independently.

In 1903, De Groot was elected to the New York State Assembly as a Republican, representing the Queens County 2nd District. He served in the Assembly in 1904, 1906, 1907, 1908, and 1909.

In 1923, De Groot was appointed Assistant United States Attorney. Of the more than 1,000 cases he tried in the Circuit Court of Appeals, he didn't lose a single one. In light of his success, in 1925 President Coolidge appointed him the U.S. Attorney for the Eastern District of New York. A series of failures occurred under De Groot as well as fights with the Justice Department, culminating with Attorneys General John G. Sargent and William D. Mitchell both requesting De Groot's resignation in 1929. Newly-elected President Hoover proceeded to oust De Groot, who returned to a private law practice afterwards.

De Groot was a founder of the Richmond Hill Record and the Temple Forum. He was a member of the Freemasons, Sigma Alpha Epsilon, and the New York State Bar Association. He was a Methodist, serving as a local preacher and chairman of the board of trustees for Mt. Morris Methodist Episcopal Church. In 1900, he married Grace Lester Atkins. Their children were Alfred Hugo, Ethel Jane, Helen Marie, and Lester Atkins.

De Groot died in Jamaica Hospital following an appendectomy on March 1, 1932. He was buried in Cypress Hills Cemetery.

References

External links 
The Political Graveyard

1869 births
1932 deaths
Lawyers from Brooklyn
Politicians from Queens, New York
Northfield Mount Hermon School alumni
Dickinson College alumni
New York University School of Law alumni
20th-century American lawyers
20th-century American politicians
Republican Party members of the New York State Assembly
United States Attorneys for the Eastern District of New York
American Freemasons
Members of the Methodist Episcopal Church
Burials at Cypress Hills Cemetery